Dongshi Town (China)  is a township-level division of Jinjiang County-level city, which in its turn is a part of Quanzhou Prefecture-level city in Fujian Province, China.

Dongshi is located on the eastern side of the Anhai Bay, which is the estuary formed by  the Shijing River as it flows into the Taiwan Strait.

See also
List of township-level divisions of Fujian

References

Township-level divisions of Fujian
Jinjiang, Fujian